North Washington Avenue Workers' House are five historic homes located at Reidsville, Rockingham County, North Carolina. They were built about 1917, for African-American workers employed by the American Tobacco Company.  The houses originally consisted of three rooms—one-over-one with a shed room behind.

It was listed on the National Register of Historic Places in 1986.

References

African-American history of North Carolina
Houses on the National Register of Historic Places in North Carolina
Houses completed in 1917
Houses in Rockingham County, North Carolina
National Register of Historic Places in Rockingham County, North Carolina